Glenn Page (born 24 March 1970) is a former Australian rules footballer who played with the Sydney Swans and North Melbourne in the Victorian/Australian Football League (VFL/AFL).

Page was recruited from Collingullie, in New South Wales, and made 18 appearances for the Sydney Swans, 10 of them in 1990. He then made his way to North Melbourne via the 1992 Pre-season Draft and played five league games in the 1992 season.

References

External links
 
 

1970 births
Australian rules footballers from New South Wales
Sydney Swans players
North Melbourne Football Club players
Living people